Edwin Cyrus Graves (March 18, 1868 – October 8, 1936) was an insurance broker, manufacturer and political figure in Ontario. He represented St. Catharines in the Legislative Assembly of Ontario from 1923 to 1934 as a Conservative member.

He was born in St. Catharines, the son of Oswin G Graves and Electra (Lettie) A  Brown, and was educated there. In 1898, he married Agnes O'Connor. Graves served on the city council for St. Catharines in 1920 and 1921 and was mayor in 1922. He died in a car accident on August 10, 1936.

References 

1868 births
1936 deaths
Progressive Conservative Party of Ontario MPPs
Mayors of St. Catharines
Road incident deaths in New York (state)